Karan Ganesh (born October 24, 1986) is an American cricketer. He played in the 2014 ICC World Cricket League Division Three tournament.

References

External links
 

1986 births
Living people
American cricketers